The genomic signature refers to the characteristic frequency of oligonucleotides in a genome or sequence.  It has been observed that the genomic signature of phylogenetically related genomes is similar.

See also
 Gene signature
 mutational signatures
 Alignment-free sequence analysis
 Bioinformatics
 Computational genomics
 K-mer
 Phylogenomics

References

Genetic mapping
Nucleic acids
Phylogenetics